John C. Calhoun (1782–1850) was the 7th vice president of the United States.

Calhoun can also refer to:

Surname
Calhoun (surname)

Inhabited places in the United States
Calhoun, Georgia
Calhoun, Illinois
Calhoun, Kansas
Calhoun, Kentucky
Calhoun, Louisiana
Calhoun, Missouri
Calhoun, South Carolina
Calhoun, Tennessee
Calhoun, West Virginia
Calhoun, Wisconsin
Calhoun County, Alabama
Calhoun County, Arkansas
Calhoun County, Florida
Calhoun County, Georgia
Calhoun County, Illinois
Calhoun County, Iowa
Calhoun County, Michigan
Calhoun County, Mississippi
Calhoun County, South Carolina
Calhoun County, Texas
Calhoun County, West Virginia
Fort Calhoun, Nebraska

Lakes in Minnesota, United States
Lake Calhoun (Kandiyohi County, Minnesota)
Lake Calhoun, Minnesota, now called Bde Maka Ska

Schools and universities in the United States
Grace Hopper College of Yale University, known as Calhoun College until 2017
Calhoun Middle School (disambiguation)
Calhoun School, New York, New York

See also
 Cahoon, a variant of the name
 Colhoun (disambiguation), a variant of the name
 Colquhoun, a related Scottish name and clan
 Kahloon (disambiguation), a similarly pronounced surname